Count Hans Hermann Carl Ludwig von Berlepsch (29 July 1850 – 27 February 1915) was a German ornithologist.

Berlepsch studied zoology at the University of Halle. He used his inherited wealth to sponsor bird collectors in South America, including Jan Kalinowski and Hermann von Ihering. His collection of 55,000 birds was sold to the Senckenberg Museum at Frankfurt on Main after his death.

Species commemorating Berlepsch include Berlepsch's six-wired bird-of-paradise,  Berlepsch's tinamou, and, in its Latin name, the bronze parotia (Parotia berlepschi).

External links
Biography (in German),   Biography (in English),

German ornithologists
1850 births
1915 deaths